is a Japanese comedian.

Ito is a resident of Nakano, Tokyo. She is a graduate of Togo Kindergarten, Futaba Elementary School, Futabachu Secondary School and High School, and Butai Geijyutsu Gakuin. She also competed on one tournament of Kunoichi, failing on the final obstacle in the first stage. She then failed the second chance round as she couldn't complete it before the winner.

Filmography

Variety

Drama

Radio series

Films

Advertisements

Music videos

References

External links
 Official profile 
  

Japanese women comedians
1970 births
Living people
People from Shibuya
Comedians from Tokyo